Jack William Midson (born 12 September 1983) is an English semi-professional footballer who plays for Sheppey United where he is player-manager.

Midson was the 2011–12 League Two joint top scorer, along with Izale McLeod, Lewis Grabban and Adebayo Akinfenwa, with 18 goals and scored 20 goals in all competitions during the 2011–12 season for AFC Wimbledon, finishing the season as their top scorer. He was AFC Wimbledon's top scorer the following season as well, scoring 15 goals in all competitions and 13 in the league.

Career

Semi-professional
Midson was born in Stevenage, Hertfordshire. He was a tennis and football coach in Cambridgeshire and Enfield as well as a semi-professional footballer. He started his career at Stevenage Borough before spells at Dagenham & Redbridge, Chelmsford City and Bishop's Stortford before a successful one and a half-year spell at Histon, where he scored 20 goals in the 2008–09 season. He also taught PE lessons at Capel Manor Primary School and others as part of a fitness organisation course.

Professional

Oxford United
After disappointment in the 2008–09 Conference play-off semi-final, Midson left Histon after firm interest from Oxford United. He joined Oxford on 16 May 2009 on a two-year professional contract. Midson featured regularly as Oxford gained promotion to the Football League after four years in the Conference Premier, and started in the 2009–10 Conference play-off final at Wembley Stadium.

On 5 November 2010, he joined Southend United on a brief loan. Following his return to Oxford, Midson scored his first career hat-trick against Torquay United on 3 January 2011. Midson joined Barnet on loan in March 2011, making his debut by coming off the bench in a 1–0 defeat at Aldershot Town.

AFC Wimbledon

In June 2011, Midson signed for AFC Wimbledon. On 9 July 2011, he made his debut in a 2–0 pre-season friendly win against a Fulham XI. He scored his first goals for AFC Wimbledon three days later, a brace in a 5–1 away friendly victory against Staines Town. He made his competitive debut in AFC Wimbledon's Football League debut, a 3–2 home defeat to Bristol Rovers. He finished the 2011–12 season as AFC Wimbledon's top scorer with 20 goals in all competitions. He also finished the season as joint-top scorer in League Two with 18 league goals in total. In June 2012, AFC Wimbledon rejected a six-figure bid for Midson from Rotherham United, and he signed an improved contract with The Dons later that month. On 2 December 2012, Midson scored for AFC Wimbledon in their first ever meeting with Milton Keynes Dons. AFC Wimbledon went on to lose the match 2–1 however. After a rather inconsistent goal scoring start to the 2012–13 League Two season, Midson hit consistent goal scoring form towards the end of the season to help lift AFC Wimbledon away from the League Two relegation zone. He passed the double figure mark for the second season in a row after scoring the only goal with a superb chip in a vital relegation 6 pointer against Aldershot Town on 16 March 2013. He then scored the winner in a 2–1 victory over Fleetwood Town which meant that AFC Wimbledon avoided relegation on the last day of the season. Midson finished his second season with AFC Wimbledon once again as the club's top scorer, having scored 15 goals in all competitions and 13 in the league to help The Dons avoid relegation from the football league and secure a third successive season in League Two.

Eastleigh
Midson signed for Eastleigh in May 2014 after being released from AFC Wimbledon. He was released at the end of the 2015–16 season.

Braintree Town
Midson signed for Braintree Town in June 2016.

Coaching career
In May 2017, Midson was signed for Leatherhead by manager Sammy Moore, a former team-mate at AFC Wimbledon, to take up a player-assistant manager role at Leatherhead.

On 2 May 2018, Midson was appointed assistant manager alongside Sammy Moore at National League South club Concord Rangers. At the end of the 2018–19 season, Midson left Concord, following Moore's departure, after the club were denied entry to the play-offs due to ground grading issues.

In May 2019, Midson joined Moore as player-assistant manager at Hemel Hempstead Town. On 20 May 2020, Midson parted company with Hemel Hempstead Town following a year at the club.

In August 2022, with manager Ernie Batten moving up to the role of Director of Football, Midson was appointed player-manager at Sheppey United ahead of their first season in the Isthmian League following promotion, the club he had been at since 2020.

Career statistics

Honours
Oxford United
Conference Premier play-offs: 2010

Sheppey United
SCEFL Premier Division: 2021–22

Individual
AFC Wimbledon Player of the Year: 2012–13

References

External links

1983 births
Living people
People from Stevenage
Footballers from Hertfordshire
English footballers
Association football forwards
Stevenage F.C. players
Harlow Town F.C. players
Hayes F.C. players
Chelmsford City F.C. players
Hendon F.C. players
Arlesey Town F.C. players
Dagenham & Redbridge F.C. players
Hemel Hempstead Town F.C. players
Bishop's Stortford F.C. players
Histon F.C. players
Oxford United F.C. players
Southend United F.C. players
Barnet F.C. players
AFC Wimbledon players
Eastleigh F.C. players
Braintree Town F.C. players
Leatherhead F.C. players
Concord Rangers F.C. players
Sheppey United F.C. players
National League (English football) players
English Football League players
Isthmian League managers